The Mercedes-Benz MB 503 was a German prototype four-stroke V-12 gasoline marine and aircraft engine, designed and concepted before World War II. The MB 503 was based on and derived from the Daimler-Benz DB 603 inverted V-12 aircraft engine. It was a liquid-cooled 12-cylinder inverted V12 enlargement of the DB 601, which was in itself a development of the DB 600. The eventual powerplants chosen to be used in the Panzer VIII Maus super-heavy tank were the MB 509 V-12 gasoline engine, derived from the Daimler-Benz DB 603; and also the MB 517 V-12 diesel engine.

MB 507 Diesel engine
The Mercedes-Benz MB 507 was a naturally-aspirated diesel engine version; derived from the MB 503. The MB 507 was also based on the Daimler-Benz DB 603 inverted V-12 aircraft engine, and shared an identical bore, stroke, and displacement. Unlike the gasoline-powered MB 503, the diesel-powered MB 507 did not use a supercharger.

References

Mercedes-Benz engines
Marine engines
Engines by model
Gasoline engines by model
V12 engines